Kystjegerkommandoen (KJK: in English "Coastal Ranger Commando") is a Norwegian amphibious unit trained to operate in littoral combat theatres, filling the role of a marine corps and coastal artillery.

History
The unit was created when it became clear that the coastal fortresses had to be abandoned due to their vulnerability to modern precision guided weapons. This was a gradual development, as the old coastal artillery branch of the Norwegian Armed Forces had been increasingly focusing on mobile operations, and less on coastal fortresses, for many years. With the establishment of the Ranger Command, this transition was complete.

The unit was declared operational 17 August 2005. Home base is at Trondenes, Harstad, North Norway.

Role
KJK operatives are trained to be highly mobile in the littoral environment, using the Combat Boat 90 and occasionally helicopters. The CB90 is capable of landing troops directly on the shore. Their main weapon against enemy vessels is the AGM-114 Hellfire missile, using a blast-fragmentation warhead. This can easily be carried in the CB90, but will (usually) be launched from ashore, taking advantage of Norway's numerous islands and rugged coast. KJK maintain a strong focus on the ISTAR concept, and train to fight asymmetrical enemy tactics. KJK have trained with allied forces, where their CB90 have been embarked from the Dutch HNLMS Rotterdam LPD and the British HMS Albion.

International operations

In November 2007, a KJK unit assisted a force of Afghan soldiers and their 14 American mentors as they came under a Taliban ambush in Badghis province in Afghanistan. When the Afghan soldiers and their American mentors were headed into an area to apprehend Taliban soldiers and leaders, they were unaware that they were headed into an ambush. The Norwegian soldiers observed this and were able to get through to their American allies on radio and warn them about the danger ahead, guiding them so they could fight themselves out of the situation. The Norwegian soldiers involved received the Army Commendation Medal for their efforts. 

In November 2007, KJK took part in Operation Front Straightening to push Taliban out of the Faryab province. 

The unit has lost three soldiers in combat during the Afghan war.

See also
Marinejegerkommandoen - Naval Special Operations Commando
Minedykkerkommandoen - Naval EOD Command

References

External links 
 

Royal Norwegian Navy
Norway
Military units and formations established in 2001